Tommaso Maria Neri (born November 2, 2001) is an Italian actor, mostly  known for his roles as Mattia as children in the movie in the movie The Solitude of Prime Numbers candidate at the 67th Venice International Film Festival and as Milo in the popular Italian soap opera Centovetrine.

He has also starred in the feature film "Una questione privata" directed by Paolo and Vittorio Taviani and in the successful TV movies "Mia and Me" and "Fabrizio De André: il Principe Libero" a biopic dedicated to Italian songwriter Fabrizio De Andre, starring as the protagonist in his teenage years.

Filmography

Music video
 Too Young To Love of Frozen Fields
 I Nostri Eroi

References

External links
 
 Tommaso Maria Neri - Official WebSite

2001 births
Living people
Italian male child actors